Andrew is a village in central Alberta, Canada that is northeast of Edmonton. Andrew is home of the world's largest duck roadside attraction, part of the Giants of the Prairies. Its post office was established March 2, 1902. The community has the name of Andrew Whitford, an early settler.

Notable people

Ed Stelmach became Alberta's premier-elect to succeed Ralph Klein on December 3, 2006. This was the result of the provincial Progressive Conservative Party's election to pick a new leader. Stelmach had been a third-place contender, but came up the middle to win the race over the favoured frontrunners. He officially became the province's premier on December 14, 2006.

Demographics

In the 2016 Census of Population conducted by Statistics Canada, the Village of Andrew recorded a population of 425 living in 201 of its 266 total private dwellings, a  change from its 2011 population of 379.

Climate

See also 
List of communities in Alberta
List of villages in Alberta

References

External links 

1930 establishments in Alberta
Villages in Alberta